The Société de natation de Strasbourg (SNS) is a French professional Water polo team based in Strasbourg. The team competes in the Championnat de France, the highest level of Water polo in France. There, Strasbourg has been a top contender.  The team plays its home games in the Piscine de la Kibitzenau.

Titles
Championnat de France (7)
 1958, 1959, 1960, 1961, 1963, 2018, 2019

Notable players
To appear in this section a player must have either:
– Set a club record or won an individual award as a professional player.
– Played at least one official international match for his senior national team at any time.
 Hugo Fontani
 Tom Coughlan

References

Water polo clubs in France
Sport in Strasbourg
Sports clubs established in 1901
1901 establishments in France